The Lempa River is a  river in Central America.

Geography
Its sources are located in between the Sierra Madre and the Sierra del Merendón in southern Guatemala, near the town of Olopa. The river continues its course for another  in El Salvador, flowing in a generally southwards direction until it reaches the Pacific Ocean in the department of San Vicente. The river forms a small part of the international boundary between El Salvador and Honduras.

Forty-nine percent of El Salvador's territory is covered by the Lempa river basin, and 77.5 percent of the Salvadoran population lives in cities, towns, and villages that are in its basin, including the capital city of San Salvador.

Hydroelectricity

There are several hydroelectric dams along the river. In El Salvador there is the Guayojo dam, the Cerrón Grande Hydroelectric Dam, the 5 de Noviembre dam, and the 15 de Septiembre dam which can be easily seen from the Pan-American highway.

See also
List of rivers of Guatemala
List of rivers of Honduras
List of rivers of El Salvador
List of rivers of the Americas by coastline

References

Rivers of El Salvador
Rivers of Guatemala
Rivers of Honduras
International rivers of North America
El Salvador–Honduras border
Border rivers